Sarabdal (also Romanized as Sarābdāl and Sarabdāl; also known as Tāzeh Kand) is a village in Gowharan Rural District, in the Central District of Khoy County, West Azerbaijan Province, Iran. At the 2006 census, its population was 371, in 91 families.

References 

Populated places in Khoy County